The Dongshi Fisherman's Wharf is a fisherman's wharf in Dongshi Township, Chiayi County, Taiwan.

History
After Taiwan joined World Trade Organization on 1 January 2002, the government realized the need to reform and change Taiwan traditional fishing industries towards recreational-oriented business to face the competition from Mainland China. Taking the advantage of the environment of Dongshi Township, the government transformed a fishing port in the township to become the multipurpose Dongshi Fisherman's Wharf.

Architecture

 Ocean Culture Hall
 Special Products Hall
 Shop Street
 Sea-Watching Pavilion
 Floating Bridge Market
 Coast Walking Platform

Transportation

See also
 Economy of Taiwan

References

External links

 

Buildings and structures in Chiayi County
Transportation in Chiayi County
Wharves in Taiwan